Jeanmaire is a surname. Notable people with the surname include:

Federico Jeanmaire (born 1957), Argentine writer
Jean-Louis Jeanmaire (1910–1992), Swiss general and Soviet spy
Zizi Jeanmaire (1924–2020), French ballet dancer, actress, and singer